The Toronto Rockets were a professional soccer team based in Toronto, Ontario, Canada that competed in the American Professional Soccer League during the 1994 season, with their home stadium at Centennial Park Stadium.

History
After the 1993 APSL season, the Toronto Blizzard folded and were replaced by the North York Rockets, who had played in the Canadian National Soccer League. This edition of the Rockets's roster was a combination of the 1993 Rockets and Toronto Blizzard, with players coming from both squads.

The Rockets finished in last place with a 5-15 record, as well as the worst attendance in the league, drawing in fewer than 1500 fans per match. The club had planned to return for the 1995 season, but withdrew only days before the start of the 1995 season, due to a financial dispute with the league's front office.

Squad members

Coaches
 Peter Felicetti (until August 5)
 Hector Marinaro, Sr. (after August 5) 
David Gee (February–May, 1995)

Season

See also
North York Rockets
Toronto Blizzard (1986–1993)

References

External links
Team photograph

Association football clubs established in 1994
Association football clubs disestablished in 1994
Defunct soccer clubs in Canada
Rock
American Professional Soccer League teams
American Professional Soccer League teams based in Canada
1994 establishments in Ontario
1994 disestablishments in Ontario